The 2022–23 Supercopa de España was the 39th edition of the Supercopa de España, an annual football competition for clubs in the Spanish football league system that were successful in its major competitions in the preceding season.

Barcelona won the tournament for their fourteenth Supercopa de España title.

Qualification
The tournament featured the winners and runners-up of the 2021–22 Copa del Rey and 2021–22 La Liga.

Qualified teams
The following four teams qualified for the tournament.

Matches
 Times listed are UTC+3.
 All three matches were held in King Fahd International Stadium in Riyadh, Saudi Arabia.

Bracket

Semi-finals

Final

See also 
2022–23 La Liga
2022–23 Copa del Rey

References

2022–23 in Spanish football cups
2022–23
2023 in Saudi Arabia